Texhoma Independent School District is a public school district based in Texhoma, Texas (USA).

Located in Sherman County, the district extends into a small portion of Hansford County.

The district operates one school serving grades K-4.  Due to its isolated location on the border of the Texas Panhandle and the Oklahoma Panhandle, the district operates under an unusual arrangement with Texhoma Public Schools, a public school district located in adjacent Texhoma, Oklahoma.  All students residing in Texhoma ISD and Texhoma Public Schools, attend school in Texhoma ISD for grades K-4, then attend school in Texhoma Public Schools for grades 5-12.  As such, graduating students can attend public universities in either Oklahoma or Texas and be eligible for in-state tuition in either state.

In 2014, the school district was rated "met standard" by the Texas Education Agency.

References

External links
Texhoma ISD

School districts in Sherman County, Texas
School districts in Hansford County, Texas